Horace Nelson Chapman (February 26, 1811 – February 6, 1884) was an American lawyer from Racine, Wisconsin who spent a single one-year term in 1850 as a Free Soil Party member of the Wisconsin State Assembly, representing the then Town (later a city) of Racine.

Background 
Chapman was originally from Becket, Massachusetts.

In Wisconsin 
In April 1843, he was appointed by the Governor and Council of Massachusetts as a "Commissioner to Administer Oaths, &c." for use back in the Commonwealth; he was already a resident of Racine.

Chapman was a delegate from Racine at the Chicago River and Harbor Convention of 1847. The convention drew 2,315 delegates from 19 states to advocate for federal support of improvements to inland rivers and harbors.

 
In November 1847 he was among the officers of the first Masonic Lodge to be organized in Racine County.

Legislative service 
In 1849, he was elected to the Assembly from the 1st Racine County district (the Town of Racine), succeeding fellow Free Soiler Marshall Strong. He was not re-elected in 1850, and was succeeded by William L. Utley, yet another Free Soiler.

References 

Members of the Wisconsin State Assembly
People from Becket, Massachusetts
Politicians from Racine, Wisconsin
Wisconsin Free Soilers
19th-century American politicians
Wisconsin lawyers
1811 births
1884 deaths
19th-century American lawyers